Ezumeri is one of the four villages existing in Oraifite Town others are Unodu (which consists of Ibolo, Umuezopi and Isingwu sub-units), Irefi and Ifite, it has traditional head known as Obi

References 

Populated places in Anambra State